Koibal language may refer to:
 Koibal language (Samoyedic), an extinct Samoyedic language
 Koybal, a dialect of the Khakas language, a modern Turkic language